Michael Stephans (born June 9, 1945) is a jazz drummer, writer, poet and college professor.

Biography and career
As a jazz drummer, Stephans has performed and recorded with artists including Dave Liebman, Bennie Maupin, Joe Lovano, Bob Brookmeyer, Don Menza, and Alan Broadbent.

Stephans' first solo recording, Om ShalOM, was critically lauded in 2007 by UK critic Tom Barlow as an album of the year in the December 2007 – January 2008 issue of Jazzwise.

Stephans has received multiple composition grants from the National Endowment for the Arts. In 1974, this association afforded him the opportunity to write the large ensemble composition "Shapes and Visions" for vibraphonist Karl Berger, which was performed at the Smithsonian Museum of Natural History in Washington, D.C.

His poetry has been published in The Note, and Inscape. In 2000, he was given the Rachael Sherwood Poetry Prize by the department of English at Cal State Northridge. He is the author of Experiencing Jazz: A Listener's Companion, published in 2013 by Scarecrow Press. and Experiencing Ornette Coleman: A Listener's Companion, published in 2017 by Rowman & Littlefield Publishers

He has taught at Pasadena City College, the University of Miami, and Bloomsburg University of Pennsylvania.

Discography

As leader

As a co-leader

As sideman
With Bob Brookmeyer
Oslo (Concord Jazz, 1987)
Stay Out of the Sun (Challenge Records, 2003)

With Bob Dorough
P Is for the People (DeesBees, 2012)

With Bennie Maupin
Penumbra (Cryptogramophone, 2006)

With Matt Vashlishan

  No Such Thing (Origin Records, 2009)

With Don Menza

•  Menza Lines (Jazzed Media, 2005)

With Larry Gelb

 The Love Song of Ian Opps (IAM Records, 2013)

With Frank Strazzeri Trio & Quartet

Frank's Blues (Night Life, 1992)

With Julie Andrews
Love, Julie (USA Music Group, 1987)

With Jack Jones
I Am a Singer (USA Music Group, 1987)

With Bo Lozoff
Eyes So Soft (Rockin' Monkey, 2006)

Bibliography

Works

References

External links
 Take Five with Michael Stephans at All About Jazz

1945 births
Living people
American jazz drummers
Musicians from Miami
American male poets
20th-century American drummers
American male drummers
20th-century American male musicians
American male jazz musicians